Ahmići is a village in central Bosnia and Herzegovina. It is located in the municipality of Vitez in the Lašva river valley.

In April 1993 during the Lašva Valley ethnic cleansing, the Croatian Defence Council forces attacked the village and massacred around 120 civilians in the Ahmići massacre. Since then many survivors have returned and have begun to rebuild their homes.

Population

Ethnic composition, census 1991

total: 466

 ethnic Muslims - 356 (76.39%)
 Croats - 87 (18.66%)
 Yugoslavs - 2 (0.42%)
 others and unknown - 21 (4.50%)

These numbers are in dispute, see the Ahmici massacre article for another pre-war (1991) analysis.

census 2013
According to the 2013 census, its population was 506.

References

 Official results from the book: Ethnic composition of Bosnia-Herzegovina population, by municipalities and settlements, 1991. census, Zavod za statistiku Bosne i Hercegovine - Bilten no.234, Sarajevo 1991.

Villages in the Federation of Bosnia and Herzegovina
Populated places in Vitez